The Basketball Champions League (BCL) Best Coach in an annual award of the Basketball Champions League, which is the third-tier level European-wide professional club basketball league, that is given to the league's best head coach of the season. The award is given by FIBA. The award began with the league's 2017–18 season.

Winners

Awards won by nationality

Awards won by club

References

External links
Basketball Champions League (official website)
FIBA (official website)

Basketball Champions League awards and honors